Gary Marks (born 25 December 1963) is an English professional golfer.

Career

Amateur
Marks earned his first European Tour start at the 1981 Martini International and made his first cut a month later at the Greater Manchester Open, aged seventeen and still an amateur. He turned professional in 1983.

Professional
He managed to get his European Tour card at Qualifying School, but a freak accident during the off season prior to taking up his European Tour membership stopped him from being able to play the next season, and the chance to play on the European Tour eluded him. 

In 1994, upon visiting relatives of his future wife in Poland, it just so happened that the Polish Open were on the same week. Marks joined and went on to win it, in the process earning a spot at the 1995 and 1996 Sarazen World Open, an unofficial PGA Tour event held near Atlanta, Georgia where winners of national open golf championships around the world were invited to play. After playing a round with and outscoring Mark Calcavecchia, Marks ended the 1996 Sarazen World Open as the top European, tied for 11th place along with Mark McNulty.

Marks played on the Challenge Tour 1995–1999. He was runner-up at the 1995 Danish Open before he won the 1996 Alianca UAP Challenger. He was again runner-up at the 1997 Memorial Olivier Barras. In 2006 he won the Open de Neuchatel on the Alps Tour, as well as the inaugural PGA Play-offs at Woodhall Spa.

Senior tour
Marks started 2015 by finishing in a tie for second place in the European Senior Tour Qualifying School Finals and played regularly on the tour that year. His best finishes were a tie for fourth place in the French Riviera Masters and a tie for sixth place in the WINSTONgolf Senior Open in Germany. In 2016 he won the EST Qualifying School Finals and in August he won the Willow Senior Golf Classic, his first victory on the senior tour. He nearly captured a second title the following year at the Sharjah Senior Golf Masters, losing a playoff to Chris Williams.

Professional wins (6)

Challenge Tour wins (1)

Alps Tour wins (1)

Other wins (2)
1994 Polish Open
2006 PGA Play-offs

European Senior Tour wins (2)

European Senior Tour playoff record (0–1)

References

External links

English male golfers
European Senior Tour golfers
People from Sidmouth
1963 births
Living people